was a New Zealand-originated trust law case heard and decided by the Judicial Committee of the Privy Council, where it was held that bribe money accepted by a person in a position of trust, can be traced into any property bought and is held on constructive trust for the beneficiary.

Facts
Mr Charles Warwick Reid was a New Zealand citizen who was employed as a Hong Kong Deputy Crown Prosecutor and then Acting Director of Public Prosecutions, so in a fiduciary relationship with the Hong Kong government. He took bribes to obstruct prosecution of some criminals, and used the money to buy land in New Zealand. Some was kept by Mr Reid and his wife, Mrs Judith Margaret Reid, some conveyed to Reid’s solicitor. The Hong Kong government argued the land was held on trust for them.

Held

The Privy Council advised the bribe money received by Reid, and the land acquired after, was held on constructive trust for the Hong Kong government. This meant that the land bought by Reid and his wife was held on trust, and had to be given over to the Hong Kong government. This was held to be necessary to ensure that people in positions of trust could in no way profit from their wrongdoing. If the property was badly invested, the fiduciary in breach would still be under a duty to make good the shortfall. Lord Templeman delivered the advice of the Board.

Lord Goff, Lord Lowry, Lord Lloyd and Sir Thomas Eichelbaum concurred.

Significance
In  the Court of Appeal declined to rely on this particular case from the Privy Council as precedent and instead preferred the original English legal position set out in Lister & Co v Stubbs (1890) LR 45 Ch D 1.

Subsequent events
Reid served a four-year prison sentence for the criminal charges relating to the bribes, after which he was deported to his native New Zealand.  Although he was barred from practising as a lawyer, he set up a legal consultancy in 2013 which provoked anger in both New Zealand and Hong Kong.

See also

English trusts law

References

English trusts case law
1993 in New Zealand law
1993 in case law
Judicial Committee of the Privy Council cases on appeal from New Zealand